Cooper's Run Baptist Church is a historic Baptist church building in Shawhan, Kentucky. It was added to the National Register of Historic Places in 1983.

The church congregation was organized in 1787.   This building, built in 1803, is an early stone church.  It is a two-story building with three bays.

References

See also
National Register of Historic Places listings in Kentucky

Baptist churches in Kentucky
Churches on the National Register of Historic Places in Kentucky
Federal architecture in Kentucky
Churches completed in 1803
19th-century Baptist churches in the United States
National Register of Historic Places in Bourbon County, Kentucky
1803 establishments in Kentucky